Tanin Manoonsilp  (born April 3, 1990 in Thailand), nickname  Bomb , is a Thai model and actor. His acting debut is Khun Chai Rachanon in the Suphapburut Juthathep series, which he played as the main cast, M.R. Rachanon Jutathep.

Life and career  
Tanin was born in Chonburi province with 3 brothers and 1 brother. Bum is the second child. There is 1 brother and 1 brother. Bum is the son of Dr. Thanet Manoonsilp, a specialist urinary system surgeon Head of Surgery Chonburi Hospital With Mrs. Pataphat Manoonsilp

Thanin graduated from secondary school from Assumption College Sriracha. Graduated from high school from Demonstration School "Phibun Bampen" Burapha University Before entering higher education Bum joined the summer English program. And traveling to study in England. Currently graduating with a bachelor's degree from the Faculty of Business Administration Assumption University (Thailand)

Career 
Tanin stepped into the entertainment industry by shooting advertisements. Later, he was portrayed as a guest actor in the drama Likit Sanae Ha  and drama Noom Ban Rai Kub Wan Ja Hai So before stepping into the role of the first hero in the drama series. Suparburoot Jutathep, when Khun Chai Rachanon

Personal life 
Tanin has special abilities in both music and sports. Music that is played regularly is a guitar piano, and the sport is tennis, basketball. In addition, Tanin has very good English language skills.

Filmography

Television series

Music video 
"Don't want to be perceived" – 
 "I will take care of you" –  OST. Suey Rai Sai Lub
 "Happy Birthday Channel 3"

Discography

Song 
 "I'll Take Care of You" – OST. Suey Rai Sai Lub
 Happy Birthday Channel 3"  with Ranida Tachasit

Concert

Award 
 Siam Dara Star Awards 2013, Best Male Star Performer
 OK Awards 2013 New Star Rising Branch
 Phra Kinnaree Award, Good People, Good Thinking, Good Society, Follow the Royal Trail
 M Thai Top Talk Awards 2014, the most talked about male actor
 Buddhist Ambassador Award World Vesak
 Sport Man 2014 Award
 The reward of mercy By the Artist Council promoting Buddhism
 Highly grateful gratitude to mothers for the year 2017 
 Asthira Iyara Award 2018, Best Supporting Actor (Male) from Chuamong Tong Mon	 
 Siam Dara Star Award 2018, The Scene Thief Award from Chuamong Tong Mon	
 Buddhist ambassador for Asanha Bucha-Phansa Day 2018

References

External links 
 

1990 births
Living people
Tanin Manoonsilp
Tanin Manoonsilp
Tanin Manoonsilp
Tanin Manoonsilp
Tanin Manoonsilp
Tanin Manoonsilp
Tanin Manoonsilp